The Parson of Panamint is a 1941 American Western film directed by William C. McGann and written by Adrian Scott and Harold Shumate. The film stars Charlie Ruggles, Ellen Drew, Phillip Terry, Joseph Schildkraut, Porter Hall and Henry Kolker. The film was released on July 25, 1941, by Paramount Pictures.

Plot

Cast 
Charlie Ruggles as Chuckawalla Bill Redfield
Ellen Drew as Mary Mallory
Phillip Terry as Rev. Philip Pharo
Joseph Schildkraut as Bob Deming
Porter Hall as Jonathan Randall
Henry Kolker as Judge Arnold Mason
Janet Beecher as Mrs. Tweedy
Clem Bevans as Crabapple Jones
Douglas Fowley as Chappie Ellerton
Paul Hurst as Jake Waldren
Frank Puglia as Joaquin Fuentes
Minor Watson as Sheriff Nickerson
Harry Hayden as Timothy Hadley
Russell Hicks as Prosecuting Attorney

References

External links 
 

1941 films
1940s English-language films
Paramount Pictures films
American Western (genre) films
1941 Western (genre) films
Films directed by William C. McGann
American black-and-white films
1940s American films